Adriel is a given name, derived from the Biblical nobleman Adriel. Notable people with the name include:

Adriel N. Williams (1916-2004), United States Air Force Brigadier General 
Adriel Johnson (1957-2010), American biologist
Adriel Brathwaite (born 1962), Barbadian politician and lawyer
Adriel Hampton (born 1978), American entrepreneur, strategist, and political figure
A. J. Green (born 1988), Adriel Jeremiah Green, American gridiron football wide receiver
Adriel Ba Loua (born 1996), Cameroonian football midfielder
AJ George (born 1996), Adriel Jared George, Antiguan football midfielder
Adriel (footballer, born 1997), Adriel Tadeu Ferreira da Silva, Brazilian football defender
Adriel Sanes (born 1998), American Virgin Islander swimmer
Adriel (footballer, born 2001), Adriel Vasconcelos Ramos, Brazilian football goalkeeper

Masculine given names